Cardiff Queen Street railway station is a railway station serving the north and east of Central Cardiff, Wales. It is the fourth busiest railway station in Wales. It is located near the major thoroughfare of Queen Street and is one of 20 stations in the city. Along with Cardiff Central, it is one of the two major hubs of the Valleys & Cardiff Local Routes local rail network. The station and its services are run by Transport for Wales.

In 2014, a reconstruction of the station was completed in order to reduce bottlenecks. Two extra platforms were put in (a previously existing platform, opposite platform 4, and a new platform next to platform 2 for the line to ), taking the total number of platforms to 5.

History

Early history

The first station close to the current site was opened by the Taff Vale Railway in October 1840 and was known as Cardiff Taff Vale. This station initially had one platform; a second was added in 1862 and, at the same time, the head office of the Taff Vale Railway was moved alongside the station. In 1887, Taff Vale station was demolished and replaced by a new station with the current name Cardiff Queen Street. At the time, it comprised two through platforms and a south facing bay, all covered by a large overall roof.

In 1858, the Rhymney Railway built its own terminus just to the east of Queen Street called . This was replaced in 1871 by a new station called Cardiff Crockherbtown, a short distance to the north-east of Queen Street. Crockherbtown station was renamed Cardiff (Rhymney) in 1888 and then Cardiff Parade in 1924. 

The Taff Vale and Rhymney railways became part of the Great Western Railway (GWR) in 1922. As there was no longer any need for two rival stations in close proximity, on 15 April 1928, the GWR opened a short connection just north of Queen Street connecting the Rhymney line to the Taff Vale line. This allowed Parade station to be closed and its services diverted to into Queen Street. To accommodate the extra Rhymney line services, Queen Street was enlarged from three to five platforms, with the addition of a new island platform.

1973 rebuild

The station remained fairly unaltered until 1973, when it was completely rebuilt by British Rail. The station's overall roof was removed, the original Taff Vale station frontage and booking hall demolished and replaced with a modern structure, and the number of platforms reduced to three: a central island platform and a south facing bay. Modern electric lifts were installed to take passengers from the subway to the new platforms. On the east side of the station, a large office block called Brunel House was constructed; until 1984, it was the headquarters of the Cardiff division of British Rail's Western Region.

In 1988, the entrance building was refurbished. In March 1990, platform 3 was turned into a through platform.

In 2005, the station was fitted with new ticket gates, operational when the station is staffed, which allow easier access in both directions. In 2006, LED screens replaced the old information display monitors.

The old station car park is now dedicated for private use by residents of a nearby modern apartment block, The Aspect.

2014 redevelopment

As part of a £220m regeneration scheme to boost train capacity in Cardiff and the surrounding areas, Cardiff Central and Cardiff Queen Street stations were redeveloped from April 2013 and June 2014 respectively. The Cardiff Area Signalling Renewal project was completed by early 2017, funded by the UK Government's Department for Transport, Welsh Government and Network Rail.

As part of the scheme, a new entrance building and two new platforms were constructed at Queen Street. This brought the number of platforms back up to the pre-1973 number of five, allowing the number of trains running through the station to be increased from 12 to 16 per hour. The new platforms were brought into use on 14 December 2014.

In the spring of 2016, a roll of honour of those who served the armed forces between 1914 and 1919 from the Taff Vale Railway was put on display in the ticket hall. In November 2017, a QR code was added to give more information about those commemorated in the roll call.

Services 

Queen Street is the main hub of the Valley Lines network – a railway system serving Cardiff, the Vale of Glamorgan, Bridgend and the South Wales Valleys – and has the solitary connection to Cardiff Bay. The station is located at the eastern end of the city centre, near the Capitol and St David's shopping centres, and sees heavy volumes of commuter rail traffic during the rush hour.

The station has five platforms at a level raised above the surrounding roads:

The typical Monday – Saturday service per hour (as of March 2016) is as follows:

Northbound (towards Coryton and the Valleys):

 6 trains per hour (tph) to Pontypridd via Cathays and Radyr, of which
 2 tph continue to Aberdare
 2 tph continue to Merthyr Tydfil
 2 tph continue to Treherbert
 4 tph to Ystrad Mynach, of which
 4 tph continue to Bargoed
 1 tph continues to Rhymney
 2 tph to Coryton

Southbound (towards Cardiff Central, Cardiff Bay, The Vale and to Radyr via the City Line):

 12 tph to Cardiff Central, of which
 8 tph continue to Grangetown via the Vale of Glamorgan Line of which
 4 tph continue to Penarth
 4 tph continue to Barry, of which
 3 tph continue to Barry Island
 1 tph continues to Bridgend via Rhoose Cardiff International Airport
 2 tph continue to Radyr via the Cardiff City Line
 2 tph terminate
 5 tph to Cardiff Bay via the Butetown Branch Line

See also
 Rail transport in Cardiff
 List of railway stations in Wales
 Transport in Wales
 Commuter rail in the United Kingdom

Notes

References

External links

Queen Street
Former Taff Vale Railway stations
DfT Category C1 stations
Railway stations in Great Britain opened in 1840
Railway stations served by Transport for Wales Rail
Adamsdown